The Christian Democratic People's Alliance (APCD) is a political party in Romania without parliamentary representation.

Presidential elections 

Conservative parties in Romania
Christian democratic parties in Europe